Azerbaijan–Paraguay relations refer to the bilateral relations exist between Azerbaijan and Paraguay. Neither country has a resident ambassador.

Diplomatic relations 
Diplomatic relations between Azerbaijan and Paraguay were established on April 20, 2004. Azerbaijan's Diplomatic mission in Paraguay has been located in Argentina since March 2012.

Rashad Aslanov is the Ambassador of Azerbaijan to Paraguay. In March 2019, Oscar Carlos Brelles Marino was appointed Honorary Consul of Azerbaijan to Paraguay.

On March 23, 2019, Azerbaijani Foreign Minister Elmar Mammadyarov paid the first official Foreign-Ministry-level visit to Paraguay.

Legal framework 
Two documents have been signed between Azerbaijan and Paraguay.

Inter-parliamentary relations 
In 2014, the inter-parliamentary friendship group between Azerbaijan and Paraguay was established in the National Congress of Paraguay.

On March 5–6, 2015, a delegation of the Milli Majlis (Parliament) visited Paraguay.

On September 10, 2015, the National Congress of Paraguay adopted the Declaration "On recognition of the sovereignty, territorial integrity and internationally recognized borders of Azerbaijan". The document notes that the Nagorno-Karabakh region is an integral part of the territory of Azerbaijan.

On March 16, 2018, the President of the Chamber of Deputies of the National Congress of Paraguay, Fernando Luc, and the Chairman of the inter-parliamentary friendship group, Juan Ramirez, visited Azerbaijan to participate in the VI Global Forum held in Baku.

Economic cooperation 

It is planned to create a chamber of commerce.

Tourism 
On March 23, 2019, in Asunción, the two governments signed an agreement "On the mutual cancellation of visa requirements for persons holding a diplomatic, official or service passport". Later, President of Azerbaijan Ilham Aliyev signed a law approving this agreement.

International cooperation 
In the international arena, cooperation is carried out within the framework of various international organizations: the UN, the Non-Aligned Movement, etc.

Paraguay supports Azerbaijan's position in the United Nations Security Council.

See also  
 Foreign relations of Azerbaijan 
 Foreign relations of Paraguay

References 

 

Paraguay
Azerbaijan